Christine Jacobson is a Trinidadian former cricketer who played for Trinidad and Tobago in WODIs.

Career 

She was part of the Trinidad and Tobago women's national cricket team in the 1973 Women's Cricket World Cup and made her Women's One Day International debut at the inaugural edition of the Women's Cricket World Cup in a groupstage clash against New Zealand. She played all 6 matches for Trinidad and Tobago in the World Cup as her side was knocked out of the first round in the tournament. She finished the tournament as the joint leading wicket taker for Trinidad and Tobago along with Nora St. Rose with 8 wickets.

References

External links 

Date of birth missing
Year of birth missing
Possibly living people
Trinidad and Tobago women cricketers
West Indian women cricketers